The Soul of a Magdalen is a 1917 American silent drama film directed by Burton L. King and starring Olga Petrova, Wyndham Standing and Mahlon Hamilton.

Cast
 Olga Petrova as Heloise Broulette 
 Wyndham Standing as Leland Norton 
 Mahlon Hamilton as Carter Vail 
 Mathilde Brundage as Mrs. Vail 
 Violet Reed as Lil 
 Gene Burnell as Alice Vail 
 Frances Walton as Mrs. Broulette 
 Richard Barthelmess as Louis Broulette 
 Boris Korlin as Valet 
 Frank Moore as Dr. Crane

References

Bibliography
 Lowe, Denise. An Encyclopedic Dictionary of Women in Early American Films: 1895-1930. Routledge, 2014.

External links
 

1917 films
1917 drama films
1910s English-language films
American silent feature films
Silent American drama films
American black-and-white films
Films directed by Burton L. King
Metro Pictures films
1910s American films